Stephan Brandner (born 29 May 1966) is a German far-right politician. He has been a member of the Bundestag for the Alternative for Germany party (AfD) since 2017 and served as chairman of the Bundestag's Legal Affairs Committee from 31 January 2018 to November 2019. He was the front runner candidate of the AfD in the state of Thuringia for the 2017 German federal election. 
Since November 2019, Brandner has been one of three chairman deputies of the AfD.

Biography
Brandner was born on 29 May 1966 in Herten. He became an industrial management assistant (Industriekaufmann) and then studied law at Universität Regensburg. Since 1997 he has been working as a lawyer, previously in Munich, then in Gera.

He is member of KStV Agilolfia Regensburg in Kartellverband katholischer deutscher Studentenvereine.

Controversies
After the Halle synagogue shooting, Brandner shared a message on Twitter, criticizing that politicians were "lingering" with candles in front of synagogues and mosques, whereas the two casualties were neither Jews nor Muslims, but "organic Germans". Social Democratic politicians and associations of German lawyers called on Brandner to resign from his office as chairman of the Bundestag's Legal Affairs Committee. Brandner is close to the positions of the ultra-nationalist wing (Der Flügel) within the AfD.

References

1966 births
Living people
Members of the Bundestag for Thuringia
People from Herten
University of Regensburg alumni
Members of the Bundestag 2021–2025
Members of the Bundestag 2017–2021
Members of the Bundestag for the Alternative for Germany
20th-century German lawyers
21st-century German lawyers